Freaks in Wonderland is the fifth album by the avant-garde metal band Ram-Zet released on January 24, 2012 in the US by Buil2Kill Records.

Track listing
 "Story Without a Happy End" - 08:04	  
 "I Am" - 05:50	  
 "Mojo" - 06:23	  
 "Land of Fury" - 06:55	  
 "Madre" - 05:53	  
 "Circle" - 05:49	 
 "The Sign" - 06:34	 
 "As the Carpet Silent Falls" - 10:01

Credits

Ram-Zet 
 Zet - Vocals, Guitar, Programming, Music, Lyrics, Arranging, Producer
 Sfinx - Vocals, Lyrics
 Sareeta - Violin, Backing vocals
 Küth - Drums, Percussion
 Ka - Keyboards, Backing vocals
 Lanius - Bass, Didgeridoo

Additional musicians and production 
Ragnhild Amb - Hon
 Ram-Zet - Arranging, Producer 
 Space Valley Studios - Recording studio
 Brett Caldas-Lima at Tower Studio - Mixing, Mastering
 Lanius - Photography - Digital image processing
 Lanius, Ka, Sfinx and Zet - Cover Artwork, Cover Layout

External links 
Metallum Archives
Discogs.com

2012 albums
Ram-Zet albums